This is a list of hospitals in the Republic of Ireland.

Connacht

County Galway &  Galway City
Bon Secours Hospital, Galway
Galway Clinic, Galway
Merlin Park University Hospital, Galway
Portiuncula University Hospital, Ballinasloe
University Hospital Galway, Galway

County Leitrim
Our Lady's Hospital, Manorhamilton

County Mayo
Mayo University Hospital, Castlebar
Ballina District Hospital, Ballina
Swinford District Hospital, Swinford
Belmullet District Hospital, Belmullet
Sacred Heart Hospital, Castlebar

County Roscommon
Roscommon University Hospital, Roscommon
Sacred Heart Hospital, Roscommon

County Sligo
Sligo University Hospital, Sligo
St. John's Hospital, Sligo           
Kingsbridge Private Hospital, Sligo

Leinster

County Carlow
St. Dympna's Hospital

County Dublin & Dublin City

Beacon Hospital
Beaumont Hospital, Dublin
Blackrock Clinic, Blackrock
Bloomfield Care Centre, Rathfarnham
Bon Secours Hospital, Dublin
Cappagh National Orthopaedic Hospital, Finglas
Central Mental Hospital, Dundrum
Cherry Orchard Hospital, Ballyfermot
Clonskeagh Hospital, Clonskeagh
Coombe Women & Infants University Hospital, Dolphin's Barn
Hermitage Clinic, Lucan, County Dublin
Highfield Hospital, Whitehall
Incorporated Orthopaedic Hospital of Ireland, Clontarf
Connolly Hospital, Blanchardstown
Dublin Dental University Hospital, Lincoln Place
Leopardstown Park Hospital, Foxrock
Mater Misericordiae University Hospital, Dublin
Mater Private Hospital, Eccles Street
Mount Carmel Community Hospital, Churchtown, Dublin  
National Maternity Hospital, Holles Street 
National Rehabilitation Hospital, Dún Laoghaire
Our Lady's Children's Hospital, Crumlin
Peamount Hospital, Newcastle 
The Rotunda Maternity Hospital
Royal City of Dublin Hospital, Baggot Street
The Royal Hospital, Donnybrook
Royal Victoria Eye and Ear Hospital, Adelaide Road
Sports Surgery Clinic, Santry, Dublin
St. Brendan's Hospital, Dublin
St Bricin's Military Hospital, Arbour Hill
St. Columcille's Hospital, Loughlinstown
St. Edmundsbury Hospital, Lucan, County Dublin
St. Ita's Hospital, Portrane
St. James's Hospital, Rialto
St. John of God Hospital, Stillorgan, Stillorgan, Dún Laoghaire–Rathdown
St. Joseph's Hospital, Dublin
St. Loman's Hospital, Palmerstown
St. Luke's Hospital, Rathgar
St. Mary's Hospital (Baldoyle), Baldoyle
St. Mary's Hospital (Phoenix Park), Phoenix Park
St. Michael's Hospital, Dún Laoghaire
St Patrick's University Hospital, Dublin 8
St. Paul's Hospital, Dublin
St. Vincent's Hospital, Fairview
St. Vincent's Private Hospital, Merrion Road
St. Vincent's University Hospital, Elm Park
Simpson's Hospital, Dundrum
Tallaght University Hospital, Tallaght
Temple Street Children's University Hospital

R County Kildare
Clane General Hospital, Clane
Naas General Hospital, Naas
St. Vincent's Hospital, Athy

County Kilkenny
Aut Even Hospital, Kilkenny
Castlecomer District Hospital, Castlecomer
Kilcreene Orthopaedic Hospital, Kilcreene
St. Canice's Hospital, Kilkenny
St. Luke's General Hospital, Kilkenny

County Laois
Midland Regional Hospital, Portlaoise
St. Fintan's Hospital, Portlaoise

County Louth
Our Lady of Lourdes Hospital, Drogheda
Louth County Hospital, Dundalk

County Meath
Our Lady's Hospital, Navan
St. Joseph's Hospital, Trim

County Offaly
Birr District Hospital, Birr
Midland Regional Hospital, Tullamore

County Westmeath
Midland Regional Hospital, Mullingar
St. Loman's Hospital, Mullingar
St. Mary's Hospital (Mullingar), Mullingar
Saint Francis Private Hospital, Mullingar

County Wexford
Ely Hospital, Wexford
Gorey District Hospital, Gorey
New Houghton Hospital, New Ross
John's Hospital, Enniscorthy
Wexford General Hospital, Wexford

County Wicklow
St. Vincent's Hospital, Wicklow
Newcastle Hospital, Newtownmountkennedy

Munster

County Clare
Ennis Hospital
St. Johns Hospital, Ennis
Cahercalla Hospice & Private Hospital, Ennis

County Cork & Cork City

Bandon Community Hospital, Bandon
Bantry General Hospital, Bantry
Bon Secours Hospital, Cork
Mater Private Hospital, Cork
Cork University Hospital, Cork
Cork University Maternity Hospital, Cork
Erinville Hospital, Cork
Mallow General Hospital, Mallow
Mater Private
Marymount Hospital, Cork
Mercy University Hospital, Cork
Shanakiel Hospital, Cork
South Infirmary-Victoria University Hospital, Cork
St. Anthony's Hospital, Dunmanway
St. Finbarr's Hospital, Cork
St. Mary's Health Campus, Cork
St. Patrick's Hospital, Fermoy
St. Stephen's Hospital, Glanmire, Cork
Tabor Lodge, Tabor

County Kerry
Bon Secours Hospital, Tralee
Cahersiveen Community Hospital (St. Anne's), Cahersiveen
Dingle Community Hospital (St. Elizabeth's), Dingle
Kenmare Community Hospital, Kenmare
Killarney Community Hospital, Killarney
Listowel Community Hospital, Listowel
University Hospital Kerry, Tralee

County Limerick & Limerick City
Barringtons Hospital, Limerick 
Croom Hospital, Croom
St. Camillus' Geriatric Hospital, Limerick
St. John's Hospital, Limerick
St. Joseph's Hospital, Limerick
University Hospital Limerick
University Maternity Hospital, Limerick

County Tipperary
Nenagh Hospital
St. Brigid's District Hospital, Carrick-on-Suir
Tipperary University Hospital, Clonmel

County Waterford & Waterford City
St. Joseph's Hospital, Dungarvan
St. Otteran's Hospital, Waterford
St. Vincent's District Hospital, Dungarvan
University Hospital Waterford, Waterford

Ulster

County Cavan
Cavan General Hospital

County Donegal
Ballyshannon
Buncrana Community Hospital, 
Carndonagh Community Hospital, Carndonagh
Donegal Community Hospital, Donegal
Dungloe Community Hospital, Dungloe
Killybegs Community Hospital, Killybegs
Letterkenny University Hospital, Letterkenny
Lifford Community Hospital, Lifford

County Monaghan
Monaghan Hospital, Monaghan

Ireland
 List
Hospitals
Ireland